Boysen State Park is a public recreation area surrounding the Boysen Reservoir, an impoundment of the north-flowing Wind River, in Fremont County, Wyoming.

History
The park was established in 1956 following completion of the Boysen Dam in 1951. It is named for Asmus Boysen, who built the site's first dam in 1908. Part of the original dam can still be seen.

Climate

According to the Köppen Climate Classification system, Boysen Dam has a cold semi-arid climate, abbreviated "BSk" on climate maps.

Activities and amenities
The park offers multiple campgrounds, boat launches, and a privately operated marina. Game fish found in the reservoir include walleye, sauger, perch, crappie, ling, rainbow, cutthroat, and brown trout.

References

External links

Boysen State Park Wyoming State Parks, Historic Sites & Trails
Boysen State Park Map Wyoming Division of State Parks and Historic Sites

State parks of Wyoming
Protected areas of Fremont County, Wyoming
Protected areas established in 1956
1956 establishments in Wyoming